Joan FitzAlan, Countess of Hereford, Countess of Essex and Countess of Northampton (1347 – 7 April 1419) was the wife of the 7th Earl of Hereford, 6th Earl of Essex and 2nd Earl of Northampton. She was the mother of Mary de Bohun, the first wife of Henry of Bolingbroke who later reigned as King Henry IV, and Eleanor de Bohun, Duchess of Gloucester. She was the maternal grandmother of King Henry V.

In 1400, she gave the order for the beheading of the Earl of Huntingdon in revenge for the part he had played in the execution of her brother, the 11th Earl of Arundel.

The estates which comprised Joan's large dowry made her one of the principal landowners in Essex, where she exercised lordship, acting as arbitrator and feoffee in property transactions.

Family

Lady Joan FitzAlan was born in 1347 at Arundel Castle, Sussex, one of seven children, and the eldest daughter of Richard FitzAlan, 10th Earl of Arundel and his second wife Eleanor of Lancaster. Her paternal grandparents were Edmund FitzAlan, 9th Earl of Arundel and Alice de Warenne, and her maternal grandparents were Henry, 3rd Earl of Lancaster and Maud Chaworth.

List of siblings
 Richard FitzAlan, 11th Earl of Arundel (1346 - 21 September 1397, Tower Hill, Cheapside, London, England), married firstly Elizabeth de Bohun, sister of Humphrey de Bohun, by whom he had seven children, and secondly Philippa Mortimer. He was beheaded on charges of high treason against King Richard II of England.
 John Fitzalan 1st Baron of Arundel, 1st Baron Maltravers (1351 - 16 December 1379), married Eleanor Maltravers, by whom he had issue. He drowned in the Irish Sea, having been shipwrecked after defeating the French off the Cornish coast.
 Alice FitzAlan (1350 - 17 March 1416), married Thomas Holland, 2nd Earl of Kent, by whom she had issue.
 Thomas Arundel Archbishop of Canterbury (1352 - 19 February 1414)
 Mary FitzAlan (died 29 August 1396), married John Le Strange, 4th Baron Strange of Blackmere, by whom she had issue, including Ankaret Le Strange who married Richard Talbot, 4th Baron Talbot. These were the parents of John Talbot, 1st Earl of Shrewsbury (It is possible that she was, however, only a half-sister, having Isabel (le Despenser) FitzAlan as her mother instead of Eleanor of Lancaster.)
 Eleanor FitzAlan (1356 - before 1366)
Joan had a half-brother from her father's first marriage to Isabel le Despenser:
 Edmund of Arundel (1327 - after 1377), he was bastardised by his parents annulment December 1344. He married 1347 Sybil de Montacute, daughter of William de Montacute, 1st Earl of Salisbury, by whom he had three daughters.
Joan had two uterine half-siblings from her mother's first marriage to John de Beaumont, 2nd Lord Beaumont (died 14 April 1342):
 Henry de Beaumont, 3rd Lord Beaumont (4 April 1340 – 17 June 1369), married as her first husband Margaret de Vere (died 15 June 1398), by whom he had issue.
 Matilda de Beaumont (died July 1367), married Hugh de Courtney.

Marriage and issue 
Sometime after 9 September 1359, Joan married Humphrey de Bohun, one of the most powerful noblemen in the realm. His titles included 7th Earl of Hereford, 6th Earl of Essex, 2nd Earl of Northampton, and he was the hereditary Constable of England.
He was the son of William de Bohun, 1st Earl of Northampton and Elizabeth de Badlesmere. Their marriage united two of the most prominent noble families in the kingdom; an alliance which was further strengthened by her elder brother Richard's marriage to Humphrey's sister, Elizabeth.

Together Humphrey and Joan produced two daughters, who upon the death of their father divided his vast estates between them: 
 Eleanor de Bohun (c.1366- 3 October 1399), co-heiress of her father. In 1376 she married Thomas of Woodstock, 1st Duke of Gloucester, the youngest son of King Edward III of England and Philippa of Hainault. The marriage produced five children, including Anne of Gloucester. Eleanor died as a nun at Barking Abbey.
 Mary de Bohun (1369/70- 1394), co-heiress of her father.  On 27 July 1380 she married Henry of Bolingbroke, who would later be crowned King Henry IV.  She died before he ascended the throne.  The marriage produced six children including King Henry V of England.

Widowhood
Joan was left a widow in January 1373 at the age of about 25 or 26, and she chose not to remarry. Her two daughters were made wards of Edward III. Sometime after her husband's death, she received from King Edward the manor of Langham, which she held until her own death, among the numerous other manors she owned. The numerous estates which comprised Joan's large dowry ensured that she was one of the principal landowners in Essex. This placed her at the hub of a powerful structure of landed country gentry, who acted as her advisers and officers; Joan in turn acted as "arbitrator, feoffee in property transactions, and intercessor with the royal government".

During the Peasants' Revolt in 1381, some of Joan's manors were sacked by the rebels; this did not deter Joan from expanding and industrialising her lands after the uprising had been put down, having done much to encourage the dyeing and fulling of woollen cloth on some of her estates such as Saffron Walden.

In the Public Record Office, London, there is an extant document, written in Latin, which records the payment to Joan by John of Gaunt for the maintenance of her younger daughter Mary after the latter's marriage until she came of age in 1384.

A member of St. Helen's religious guild in Colchester, Joan founded chantries and was also a patron of Walden Abbey, having donated money for relics, vessels, vestments, and the construction of new buildings. She is described in the State Rolls as having been a "great benefactress" to the monasteries of Essex.

Execution of John Holland, 1st Duke of Exeter
In 1397, Joan's brother Richard Fitzalan, 11th Earl of Arundel and a Lord Appellant was executed on Tower Hill for his opposition to King Richard II of England. The king's half-brother John Holland, 1st Duke of Exeter, Earl of Huntingdon accompanied him to the scaffold, as one of King Richard's representatives. Less than three years later in 1400, when Holland joined a conspiracy to murder the new king Henry IV (Joan's former son-in-law), and was captured near Joan's principal residence Pleshy Castle in Essex, he was turned over to her for punishment. Described as having possessed a "stern character", she showed him no mercy, and promptly gave orders for his decapitation, after having summoned the children of her dead brother to witness the execution. Following the beheading, which was performed without benefit of a trial, she ordered that Holland's severed head be raised on the end of a pike, which was placed upon the battlements of Pleshy Castle.

Henry IV rewarded Joan for her services on behalf of the Crown, by granting her custody of forfeited lands and properties. When Henry died in 1413, Joan's grandson Henry V followed suit; therefore up until her death in 1419, a large number of forfeited estates had come under her control.

Death 
Lady Joan FitzAlan died on 7 April 1419 and was buried with her husband in Walden Abbey, which she had previously endowed.

In fiction 
Joan appears as a character in Georgette Heyer's last book My Lord John, which is set in the reign of King Henry IV.

Ancestry

References

People from Arundel
Hereford
Daughters of British earls
14th-century English people
15th-century English people
1347 births
1419 deaths
14th-century English women
15th-century English women
Wives of knights